Neukloster (German: Bahnhof or Haltestelle Neukloster) is a rapid transit train station, located in Neukloster, a village now part of the town Buxtehude, Lower Saxony. The trains of the Hamburg S-Bahn serve the station with the line S3 from Pinneberg via Hamburg-Altona station and central station to Stade.

See also
 List of Hamburg S-Bahn stations

References

External links

Hamburg S-Bahn stations in Lower Saxony
Buildings and structures in Stade (district)
Railway stations in Germany opened in 1881